
Gmina Stupsk is a rural gmina (administrative district) in Mława County, Masovian Voivodeship, in east-central Poland.

Villages
Gmina Stupsk contains the villages and settlements of Bolewo, Budy Bolewskie, Dąbek, Dunaj, Feliksowo, Jeże, Konopki, Krośnice, Morawy, Olszewo-Bołąki, Olszewo-Borzymy, Olszewo-Chlebowo, Olszewo-Grzymki, Olszewo-Marcisze, Olszewo-Reszki, Olszewo-Tosie, Pieńpole, Rosochy, Stefankowo, Strzałkowo, Stupsk, Sułkowo-Baraki, Sułkowo-Kolonia, Wola Szydłowska, Wola-Kolonia, Wyszyny Kościelne, Zdroje, Żmijewo Kościelne, Żmijewo-Gaje, Żmijewo-Kuce, Żmijewo-Podusie, Żmijewo-Ponki, Żmijewo-Szawły and Żmijewo-Trojany.

Neighbouring gminas
Gmina Stupsk is bordered by the gminas of Grudusk, Regimin, Strzegowo, Szydłowo and Wiśniewo.

References

Polish official population figures 2006

Stupsk
Mława County